Adolf Löblich (born 14 March 1938) is an Austrian rower. He competed in the men's double sculls event at the 1960 Summer Olympics.

References

External links
 

1938 births
Living people
Austrian male rowers
Olympic rowers of Austria
Rowers at the 1960 Summer Olympics
Sportspeople from Vienna